Maurice Leo (Shorty) Dee (October 4, 1889 – August 12, 1971) was a Canadian right-handed Major League Baseball shortstop. He played one game for the St. Louis Browns in the  season. He had no hits in three at-bats, with one walk and a run scored.

External links

1889 births
1971 deaths
Canadian expatriate baseball players in the United States
St. Louis Browns players
Major League Baseball shortstops
Major League Baseball players from Canada
Sportspeople from Halifax, Nova Scotia
Baseball people from Nova Scotia
Brockton Shoemakers players
Lowell Grays players
San Antonio Bronchos players
Fort Worth Panthers players
Worcester Boosters players
Hartford Senators players
Terre Haute Browns players